Earl Heyman (born September 5, 1987) is a former American football defensive tackle, earning a Super Bowl ring with the New Orleans Saints against the Indianapolis Colts.

College career
Heyman played college football at Louisville, finishing his career with 112 tackles, 8.5 sacks, one Interception, 7 pass deflections and 2 Forced fumbles.

Professional career

New Orleans Saints
On May 11, 2009, Heyman signed with the New Orleans Saints as an undrafted free agent. On September 5, 2009, he was released, and was signed to the practice squad. On February 19, 2010, he again was signed to a roster contract, and released on July 29 of that year.

Edmonton Eskimos
On August 23, 2010, Heyman signed with the Edmonton Eskimos  of the Canadian Football League to join the practice roster. On September 2, 2010, he was released from the practice roster.

Cleveland Gladiators
On April 25, 2011, Heyman signed with the Cleveland Gladiators of the Arena Football League.

Boxing career
Heyman defeated Chris Bascler to become the 2012 Heavyweight Golden Gloves Boxing Champion in the state of Indiana. He also won the 2012 Ringside world championships in the heavyweight division. He is currently 24-0, with 22 KO's.

References

External links
Louisville bio
New Orleans Saints bio

1987 births
American football defensive tackles
Canadian football defensive linemen
American players of Canadian football
Cleveland Gladiators players
Edmonton Elks players
Living people
Louisville Cardinals football players
New Orleans Saints players
Players of American football from Louisville, Kentucky
Players of Canadian football from Louisville, Kentucky
Ballard High School (Louisville, Kentucky) alumni